Gilding is a surname. Notable people with the surname include:

Andrew Gilding (born 1970), English darts player
Jack Gilding (born 1988), English rugby union player
John Gilding (1884–1969), Australian rules footballer
Lincoln Gilding (born 1992), Australian motorcycle racer
Paul Gilding, Australian environmentalist, consultant and writer